Waitpinga may refer to.

Hundred of Waitpinga, a cadastral unit in South Australia
Waitpinga, South Australia, a locality
Waitpinga Conservation Park, a protected area in South Australia